Quarry Steps, Durdham Down is a 0.006 hectare geological Site of Special Scientific Interest near Durdham Down in Bristol, notified in 1990.

It was in this area that the first Thecodontosaurus fossil was discovered in 1834.

Sources

 English Nature citation sheet for the site  (accessed 13 July 2006)

Sites of Special Scientific Interest in Avon
Sites of Special Scientific Interest notified in 1990
The Downs, Bristol
Geology of Bristol